The Basque Country, also called Basque Autonomous Community (EAE; , CAPV), is an autonomous community of Spain. It includes the provinces (and historical territories) of Álava, Biscay, and Gipuzkoa, located in the north of the Iberian Peninsula, bordering on the autonomous communities of Cantabria, Castile and León, La Rioja, and Navarre, and the French region of Nouvelle-Aquitaine.

The Basque Country or Basque Autonomous Community is enshrined as a 'nationality' within the Spanish State in its 1979 statute of autonomy, pursuant to the administrative acquis laid out in the 1978 Spanish Constitution. The statute provides the legal framework for the development of the Basque people on Spanish soil. Navarre, which had narrowly rejected a joint statute with Gipuzkoa, Álava and Biscay in 1932, became a full-fledged foral autonomous community in 1982.

Currently there is no official capital in the autonomous community, but the city of Vitoria-Gasteiz, in the province of Álava, is the de facto capital as the location of the Basque Parliament, the headquarters of the Basque Government, and the residence of the President of the Basque Autonomous Community (the Palace of Ajuria Enea). The High Court of Justice of the Basque Country has its headquarters in the city of Bilbao. Whilst Vitoria-Gasteiz is the largest municipality in area, with 277 km2 (107 sq mi), Bilbao is the largest in population, with 353,187 people, located in the province of Biscay within a conurbation of 875,552 people.

The term Basque Country may also refer to the larger cultural region (Basque: Euskal Herria), the home of the Basque people, which includes the autonomous community.

Geography
The topography of the Basque Country is mainly mountainous. It is made up of the Basque Mountains and the Sierra de Cantabria in the south, with Larrasa (1453 meters) as the maximum altitude. The highest point in the Community is Mount Aitxuri, with an altitude of 1,551 meters, and located in Aizkorri Natural Park.

The following provinces make up the autonomous community:

 Álava (Basque Araba), capital Vitoria-Gasteiz
 Biscay (Spanish Vizcaya, Basque Bizkaia), capital Bilbao-Bilbo
 Gipuzkoa (Spanish Guipúzcoa), capital Donostia-San Sebastián

Features

The Basque Country borders Cantabria and the Burgos province to the west, the Bay of Biscay to the north, France (Nouvelle-Aquitaine) and Navarre to the east and La Rioja (the Ebro River) to the south. The territory has three distinct areas, which are defined by the two parallel ranges of the Basque Mountains. The main range of mountains forms the watershed between the Atlantic and Mediterranean basins. The highest point of the range is in the Aizkorri massif (1551 m). The three areas are:

Atlantic Basin
Formed by many valleys with short rivers that flow from the mountains to the Bay of Biscay, like the Nervión, Urola or Oria.
The coast is rough, with high cliffs and small inlets. The main features of the coast are the Bilbao Abra Bay and the Estuary of Bilbao, the Urdaibai estuary and the Bidasoa-Txingudi Bay that forms the border with France.

Middle section
Between the two mountain ranges, the area is occupied mainly by a high plateau called Llanada Alavesa (the Álava Plains), where the capital Vitoria-Gasteiz is located. The rivers flow south from the mountains to the Ebro River. The main rivers are the Zadorra River and Bayas River.

Ebro Valley
From the southern mountains to the Ebro is the so-called Rioja Alavesa, which shares the Mediterranean characteristics of other Ebro Valley zones. Some of Spain's production of Rioja wine takes place here.

Plaiaundi Ecology Park 
The Plaiaundi Ecology Park is a 24 -hectare coastal wetland lying where the Bidasoa River meets the sea in the Bay of Biscay.The nature of Plaiaundi consists of a wide variety of flora (visitors view them mainly in the spring) and fauna (visitors with binoculars arrive all during the year, because of the birds migratory habits).

Climate
The Basque mountains form the watershed and also mark the distinct climatic areas of the Basque Country:
The northern valleys, in Biscay and Gipuzkoa and also the valley of Ayala in Álava, are part of Green Spain, where the oceanic climate is predominant, with its wet weather all year round and moderate temperatures. Precipitation average is about 1200 mm.

The middle section is influenced more by the continental climate, but with a varying degree of the northern oceanic climate. This gives warm, dry summers and cold, snowy winters.

The Ebro valley has a pure continental climate: winters are cold and dry and summers very warm and dry, with precipitation peaking in spring and autumn. Due to the proximity to the ocean however, the Ebro part of the Basque Country is moderate compared to areas further inland.

Demographics

Almost half of the 2,155,546 inhabitants of the Basque Autonomous Community live in the Bilbao metropolitan area, almost the entirety of the province of Biscay. Six of the ten most populous cities in the region form part of Bilbao's conurbation (Bilbao, Barakaldo, Getxo, Portugalete, Santurtzi and Basauri), which is widely known as Greater Bilbao.

With 28.2% of the Basque population born outside this region, immigration is crucial to Basque demographics. Over the 20th century most of this immigration came from other parts of Spain, typically from Galicia or Castile and León. Over recent years, sizeable numbers of this population have returned to their birthplaces and most immigration to the Basque country now comes from abroad, chiefly from South America.

As of 2018, there were 151,519 foreigners in the Basque country, 7% of the population.

Roman Catholicism is, by far, the largest religion in Basque Country. In 2019, the proportion of Basques that identify themselves as Roman Catholic was 60%, while it is one of the most secularised communities of Spain: 24.6% were non-religious and 12.3% of Basques were atheist.

Major cities

History

The forerunner of the Gernika Statute was the short-lived Statute of Autonomy for Álava, Gipuzkoa and Biscay, which came to be enforced in October 1936 just in Biscay, with the Spanish Civil War already raging, and which was automatically abolished when the Spanish Nationalist troops occupied the territory.

Before the Spanish Constitution of 1978 and its system of autonomous communities, these three provinces were known in Spanish as the Provincias Vascongadas since 1833. The political structure of the new autonomous community is defined in the Gernika Statute, which was approved by a majority in a referendum held on 25 October 1979. Nowadays it is one of the most decentralised regions in the world; in this regard it has been described as having "more autonomy than just about any other in Europe" by The Economist.

As regards the bounds to the Spanish Constitution, Basque nationalists cite the fact that in the 1978 Spanish Constitution referendum, which was passed with a majority of votes and a poor turnout in this area, the Basque Country had the highest abstention (the Basque Nationalist Party had endorsed abstention on the grounds that the Constitution was being forced upon them without any Basque input). To this, the "NO" vote in this referendum was also higher in the Basque Country than in the rest of the state. All in all, many Basques believe that they are not bound to a constitution that they never endorsed.

The Statute of Autonomy of the Basque Country is an organic law but powers have been devolved gradually during decades according to re-negotiations between the Spanish and the consecutive Basque regional governments to reach an effective implementation, while the transfer of many powers are still due and has always been a matter of heated political discussion. Basque nationalists often put down this limitation in the devolution of powers to concessions made to appease the military involved in the 23-F coup d'état attempt (1981).

In 2003, the governing Basque Nationalist Party (PNV) proposed to alter this statute through the Ibarretxe Plan. The Ibarretxe bill was approved by absolute majority in the Basque Parliament after much discussion, as it was subject to lengthy legal objections—on the grounds that it contradicts the Spanish Constitution—that were ultimately overcome. Despite its mandate of the majority of the autonomous Parliament, the main two parties in Spain (PSOE, PP) imposed a blockade on a discussion of the Plan in the Spanish Parliament (Madrid Cortes Generales), resulting in its rejection for debate by a large majority of that Parliament in January 2005.

Since the first autonomic cabinet, the Basque Nationalist Party has held office in the Basque Autonomous Community except for a 2009–2012 term, led by Patxi López (PSE-PSOE). The current Basque prime minister is Iñigo Urkullu, also a member of the Basque Nationalist Party. Despite ETA's ceasefire in 2011, this autonomous community showed the highest rate of police per 100 inhabitants in Western Europe by 2018. As agreed with the Spanish premier Zapatero in 2004, Urkullu intends to increase the figure of ertzainas, while the Spanish PP's Ministry of Interior rejected a pullback of Spanish police bodies, as demanded by the large majority of the political forces in the autonomous parliament, even pointing to an increase of the Guardia Civil in the future.

Politics

Governmental institutions

The current laws configure the autonomous community as a federation of its present-day three constituent provinces. These western Basque districts kept governing themselves by their own laws and institutions even after the Castilian invasion in 1199–1200. The new king upheld their institutional system issued from the customary law prevalent in Basque and Pyrenean territories. This limited self-government, similar to the one for Navarre, was partially suppressed in 1839 and totally in 1876 in exchange for an agreement on tax-collection and a number of administrative prerogatives. These in turn were suspended by Franco for Gipuzkoa and Biscay, but restored by the Spanish Constitution of 1978.

The post-Franco Spanish Constitution of 1978 acknowledges historical rights and attempts a compromise in the old conflict between centralism and the different national identities (Basque, Catalan and Galician). A negotiation between UCD's Suárez in office and PNV led to the establishment of the Basque statute, with its first article stating that the Basque people (Euskal Herria) takes on an institutional personality in the form of the Basque Autonomous Community; the second article goes on to establish that it may be constituted by Álava, Biscay, Gipuzkoa, as well as Navarre. Provincial councils provided with actual relevant attributions (taxation, etc.) were restored to these provinces (called therefore diputación foral), but Navarre detached from the Basque political process. A specific approach to the national realities in Spain was eventually diffused by a legal provision allowing for the establishment of autonomous administrations and parliaments to any region in Spain (e.g. Castile and León, Catalonia, the Valencian Community, etc.), while the Basques, Catalans, and Galicians were acknowledged historic specificity. 
 
The provinces in the Basque Country still perform tax collection in their respective territories, but with limited margin in decision making under the Spanish and European governments. Under this intricate system, the Diputaciones Forales (Basque: Foru Aldundiak) administer most of each of the provinces but are coordinated by the autonomous Basque Government (Spanish Gobierno Vasco, Basque: Eusko Jaurlaritza). The autonomous community has its own police force (the Ertzaintza), controls Education and Health Systems, and has a Basque radio/TV station. These and only some of the powers acknowledge in the Gernika Statute have since 1980 been transferred to the Autonomous Community by the Cortes Generales under the Gernika Statute. The seats of the Basque Parliament and Government are in Vitoria-Gasteiz, so this is the capital city de facto, but the Basque Autonomous Community has no capital de iure.

The Parliament is composed of 25 representatives from each of the three provinces. The Basque Parliament elects the Lehendakari (President of the Autonomous Community of the Basque Country) who forms a government following regular parliamentary procedures. Until 2020, except for the 2009–2012 period, all Lehendakaris (even those in 1937 and during the exile) have been members of the Basque Nationalist Party (Euzko Alderdi Jeltzalea) (moderate and Christian-Democrat) since 1978. Despite their continued leadership role, they have not always enjoyed majorities for their party and have needed to form coalitions with either Spain wide parties or left-leaning Basque nationalist parties, often governing in a difficult minority position. Since 1982 until the late 1990s, Basque nationalists ideologically closer to ETA refused to turn out in the Basque parliament, a significant wedge of the parliament. Currently, the Basque Government is headed by Iñigo Urkullu (PNV).

Present-day political dynamics
2012 ETA's permanent ceasefire (2010–2011) opened the possibility of new governmental alliances and has enabled EH Bildu's electoral success and rise to governmental institutions (Gipuzkoa, and capital city Donostia, 2011–2015). In the 2012 Basque parliamentary election, the PNV obtained a plurality of the votes, followed by the left-wing nationalist coalition EH Bildu (Eusko Alkartasuna, Sortu, Alternatiba).

In 2016 the Basque regional election was held on 25 September to elect the 11th Parliament of the Basque Autonomous Community, which left a hung parliament, with the combination of Basque nationalist parties (PNV and EH Bildu) representing the largest wedge in the parliament of the Basque Autonomous Community, the main Spanish parties PP and PSOE's branches occupying a 24% of the seats, and Podemos – Ahal Dugu accounting for 11 seats (14,66% of the total). However, the leading party PNV renewed its traditional alliance with the PSE to form government.

During the 2017 Catalan referendum crisis, the parliament showed its sympathy and support to the Catalan independence referendum and lashed out at the Spanish government's stance on the issue, denouncing any measures it may take against the vote or 'democracy' altogether. Besides supporting the vote, Basques of this community showed a preference for further self-government (43,5%), with independence and present-day status quo ranking as second and third options (22,6% and 18,9%). In 2016, the parliament of the autonomous community passed a Police Abuses Act spanning the period between 1978 and 1999; it was shortly repealed after being challenged by the public prosecutor and appealed also by virtually all police and Civil Guard unions. Incoming Spanish premier Pedro Sánchez agreed to lift the public prosecutor's block on the law in exchange for altering its content. Right-wing parties in Spain, Vox, PP, and Ciudadanos, sent one MP out of 18 to the Spanish Congress from this autonomous community in the 2019 November general election in contrast with their rise and important presence in the overall Spanish results.

Territorial issues
The statute, insofar as it is addressed and provides an administrative framework for the Basque people, provides the mechanisms for neighbouring Navarre to join the three western provinces if it wishes to do so, since at least part of it is ethnically Basque. The Basque Government used the "Laurak Bat", which included the arms of Navarre, as its symbol for many years. The Navarrese Government protested, and tribunals ruled in their favour. The Basque Government replaced it with an empty red field.

Navarre is one of the historical Basque territories and even claimed by the Basque nationalists as the core of the Basque nation. There are also two enclaves surrounded by Basque territory—Treviño (Basque: Trebiñu) and Valle de Villaverde (Basque: Villaverde-Turtzioz)—which belong to the fellow neighbouring communities of Castile and León and Cantabria respectively, for which a legal connection to the Basque Country has become an on-off matter of political discussion.

Economy

The Basque Autonomous Community ranks first in Spain in terms of per capita product, it's the most economically productive region of the country with a gross domestic product (GDP) per capita (adjusted to purchasing power parity, PPP) being 22% higher than that of the European Union and 30% higher than Spain's average in 2016 at €34,400. In 2019, the community showed a surplus in public finances, at 0.3% of the GDP.

Industrial activities were traditionally centred on steel and shipbuilding, mainly due to the rich iron ore resources found during the 19th century around Bilbao. The Estuary of Bilbao was the centre of Euskadi's industrial revolution during the 19th and the first half of the 20th century. These activities decayed during the economic crisis of the 1970s and 1980s, giving ground for the development of the services sector and new technologies.

Today, the strongest industrial sectors of the Basque Country's economy are the manufacturing sector, present in the valleys of Biscay and Gipuzkoa; aeronautics and logistics in Vitoria-Gasteiz; and finance and energy, in Bilbao.

The biggest companies in the Basque Country are: BBVA, one of the largest financial institutions in the world and Spain's second largest bank; the multinational energy company Iberdrola (both of them have their headquarters in Bilbao); Mondragón Cooperative Corporation, the largest cooperative in the world; railway vehicle manufacturer CAF and Gamesa, the world's second largest wind turbine manufacturer.

Eight out of ten Spanish municipalities with the lowest unemployment rates were found across this autonomous community in 2015, highlighting such towns as Arrasate, Portugalete and Barakaldo with a strong manufacturing industrial make-up. The Basque Autonomous Community ranked above other communities in Spain in terms of resilience in the face of the economic crisis, going on to become a beacon and a subject of study in Europe.

In 2013 the Basque Country outperformed Spain in several parameters, but economic overall figures were highly variable. Spanish figures are subject to conspicuous seasonal fluctuation, relying on its tourist and services sectors, while Basque performance is rather based on mid- and long-term results, according with its more industrial focus. In the last quarter of 2017, unemployment in this autonomous community rose to 11.1% (8.43% in Gipuzkoa), second lowest in Spain after Navarre, at a percentage slightly higher than the EU average (10.8%), but still ahead of the Spanish overall unemployment rate of around 16.55%, the second highest in the EU.

Unemployment rate (December data) (%)

In regards to GDP performance, 2017 was a remarkably positive year for the Basque Autonomous Community. It underwent an increase in GDP of 3.0%, close to the Spanish increase, 3.1%.

The Basque Government's high-ranking officials, as well as Basque-based party leaders and personalities, have protested and voiced their concern over the detrimental effects of austerity measures passed by the Spanish Government as of 2011, overruling Basque taxation powers, may be having on industry and trade, especially export. Basque officials have strongly advocated for participation, along with Navarre, in the Ecofin, with a full membership, in order to defend Basque interests in line with Basque reality and fiscal status, and not as a Spanish subsidiary.

Transport

The strategic geographical location of the Basque Country as a link between the northwest and centre of Spain and the rest of Europe makes this territory heavily transited.

Road
The main backbones of road transport are the AP-8 motorway which links Bilbao, San Sebastián and the French border and the A-1 motorway which links San Sebastián and Vitoria-Gasteiz with central Spain. Other important routes include the AP-68 motorway which links Bilbao with the Mediterranean.

Rail
Euskal Trenbide Sarea (Basque Railway Network) is the Basque Government-owned company that maintains and creates the railway infrastructure in the autonomous region. Euskotren is the Basque Government-owned narrow gauge rail company that operates commuter services in Bilbao and San Sebastián, intercity Bilbao–San Sebastián service, and Euskotren Tranbia tram services in Bilbao and Vitoria-Gasteiz.

Metro Bilbao operates two metro lines that serve the Greater Bilbao area while Euskotren operates a third which opened in 2017. Euskotren operates a metro-like service in the San Sebastián area.

The Spanish government owns two main RENFE broad gauge lines that link Vitoria-Gasteiz with San Sebastián and Bilbao with central Spain. It also operates Cercanías commuter lines in both Bilbao and San Sebastián.

The FEVE narrow-gauge rail company operates a commuter line between Bilbao and Balmaseda and links Bilbao with the rest of northern Spain.

A new high-speed network (called Basque Y) currently under construction will link the three capitals in 'Y' formation. Because of the rough geography of the territory, most of the network will run through tunnels, with a total estimated cost of up to €10 billion.

The estimated ecological impact of the project has encouraged the formation of a group campaigning against it called AHTrik Ez Elkarlana. The group uses social disobedience to oppose the project and promotes referendums against it in the towns it most affects. In spite of the vocal opposition to the project by this and other community groups (as well as EH Bildu), work continues, not without uncertainty. In early 2015, an estimate suggested that the average Basque intercity fare would rise to a non-competitive €25, while the Spanish central government's funding has been subject to continuous delays, spurring the irritation of the Basque government in Vitoria-Gasteiz.

Airports

The three capitals have airports:
Bilbao Airport (BIO) International
Vitoria Airport (VIT)
San Sebastián Airport (EAS)
Of the three, the most important hub and entry point to the Basque Country is Bilbao Airport, offering many international connections. Nearly 4,600,000 passengers passed through it in 2016.

Seaports

The two most important ports are the Port of Bilbao and the Port of Pasaia. There are also minor fishing ports, such as Bermeo and Ondarroa.

The Port of Bilbao is by far the most important in the Basque Country and the north of Spain, being the fourth most important in Spain with over 38 million tons of traffic.

All cruising routes arrive in Bilbao and there is a ferry service linking Bilbao with Portsmouth (United Kingdom).

Culture

Languages

In the Basque Autonomous Community, two languages have been spoken for centuries, Spanish and Euskera or Basque. Basque, unlike the rest of modern Spanish languages, does not come from Latin nor does it belong to the Indo-European family.

Spanish and Basque are co-official in all territories of the autonomous community. The Basque-speaking areas in the modern-day autonomous community are set against the wider context of the Basque language, spoken to the east in Navarre and the French Basque Country. The whole Basque-speaking territory has experienced both decline and expansion in its history. The Basque language experienced a gradual territorial contraction throughout the last nine centuries, and important changes in its sociolinguistic situation in the 20th century for several reasons, including heavy immigration from other parts of Spain, lack of official interest in the promotion of the language, the virtual nonexistence of Basque-language schooling, and some national policies implemented by the different Spanish régimes in the 20th century (see Language policies of Francoist Spain). After the advent of the Statute of Autonomy of the Basque Country in 1982 following Franco's death, this reductive trend was gradually reversed thanks to the Basque-language schools and the new education system. Basque has always had a strong presence in most of Gipuzkoa, central and eastern Biscay and the northern edge of Álava, while most Basque speakers in western Biscay and the rest of Álava are second-language speakers.

The 2006 sociolinguistic survey of all Basque provinces showed that in 2006 of all people aged 16 and above in the Basque Autonomous Community, 30.1% were fluent Basque speakers, 18.3% passive speakers and 51.5% did not speak Basque. The percentage of Basque speakers was highest in Gipuzkoa (49.1% speakers) and lowest in Álava (14.2%). These results represent an increase on previous years (29.5% in 2001, 27.7% in 1996 and 24.1% in 1991). The highest percentage of speakers was now be found in the 16-24 age range (57.5%), while only 25.0% of those 65 and older reported speaking Basque.

Ten years later, the sociolinguistic survey showed that in 2016 of all people aged 16 and above in the Basque Autonomous Community, 33.9% were fluent Basque speakers, 19.1% passive speakers and 47% did not speak Basque. The proportion of Basque speakers was again highest in Gipuzkoa (50.6%) and lowest in Álava (19.2%).

Cuisine

Basque cuisine is an important part of Basque culture. According to the chef Ferran Adrià, San Sebastián "in terms of the average quality of the food, in terms of what you can get at any place you happen to walk into, maybe it is—probably it is, yes—the best in the world." The most popular dishes are seafood, fish (for example Marmitako) and "Pintxos", bar finger food.

During the 1970s, several chefs from the Basque Country, particularly Juan Mari Arzak and Pedro Subijana, led a gastronomic revolution, translating to Spain the principles of French nouvelle cuisine. The first Spanish restaurant to be awarded 3 stars in the Michelin Guide was, in fact, Zalacaín, a Basque restaurant, although located in Madrid. Today, the Basque Country, alongside Catalonia, is the Spanish region with a higher density of stars in the Michelin Guide, and it has become a preferred destination of many gastronomic tourists, both domestic and international. Four restaurants boast 3 stars, the highest possible award: Juan María Arzak (Arzak restaurant), Martín Berasategui (Berasategui restaurant), Pedro Subijana (chef of Akelarre) and Eneko Atxa (Azurmendi restaurant). In the new generation of chefs, Andoni Luis Aduriz, Mugaritz restaurant, is outstanding.

The coastal city of San Sebastián is home to the Basque Culinary Center, an academic research institution focused on higher education and research in the areas of gastronomy and nutrition.

Basque food is one of the reasons for tourism to the Basque Country, especially the pintxos. A popular way to socialize is "ir de pintxos" or txikiteo, a Basque version of a pub crawl, albeit generally more civilized.

Music
Among the classical composers we have to mention Juan Chrysostom de Arriaga, nicknamed the Spanish Mozart. And others like Jose Maria Usandizaga, Jose Maria Iparraguirre, Sebastian Iradier, Francisco Escudero, Carmelo Bernaola, Pablo Sorozabal, Luis de Pablo, Gabriel Erkoreka and Jesus Guridi.

More recently singers such as Luis Mariano, Benito Lertxundi, Mikel Laboa, Kepa Junkera, Fermin Muguruza, Ruper Ordorika, Amaia Montero, Mikel Erentxun, Maialen Lujambio, and Alex Ubago and groups such as Pantxoa eta Peio, Mocedades, Oskorri, Ken Zazpi, Itoiz, La Oreja de Van Gogh, Phyto and Fitipaldis, Kortatu, S.A., Kulto kultibo, Kaotiko, Gatillazo and Eskorbuto.

In this context, the San Sebastián Jazz Festival is quite well known, as is the Vitoria Jazz Festival. It also highlights the San Sebastián Music Fortnight and the Kobetasonic festival in Bilbao.

In the field of lyricism, the Orpheus Donostiarra and the soprano Ainhoa Arteta have gained much fame. Also important is the reputation of the Bilbao Symphony Orchestra and that of Euskadi.

Sports

Basque rural sports, known as Herri Kirolak in Basque, are a number of sports competitions rooted in the traditional lifestyles of the Basque people, for example Basque pelota, the Basque version of the European game family that includes real tennis and squash. Basque players, playing for either the Spanish or the French teams, dominate international competitions.

The Basque country is also home to former national football champions Athletic Club from Bilbao. It has a strict Cantera policy of employing only players born or trained in the Basque Country (greater region). Athletic's policy does not apply to head coaches, with famous names as Howard Kendall and Jupp Heynckes coaching the team at various points. In spite of this, the club shares with worldwide heavyweights Real Madrid and FC Barcelona the distinction of never being relegated from the top flight.

Another major Basque Country club is Real Sociedad from San Sebastián, who contest the Basque derby with Athletic. Real Sociedad used to practise the same policy, until they signed Irish striker John Aldridge in the late 1980s. Since then, Real Sociedad have had many foreign players. Xabi Alonso became the only Basque player to win both the World Cup and the club European Cup and he played in the Real Sociedad. The region is also home to other La Liga clubs SD Eibar and Deportivo Alavés.

The most renowned Basque footballer of all time is possibly Andoni Zubizarreta who holds the record for appearances in La Liga with 622 games and has won six league titles and the European Cup. Nowadays, the best known Basque football player is Xabi Alonso, winner of two UEFA European Championships and one World Cup, who played for Real Sociedad, Liverpool, Real Madrid and Bayern Munich, but retired in 2017. Other notable Basque players include Mikel Arteta, Asier Illarramendi, Andoni Iraola, Aritz Aduriz, Xabi Prieto and Ander Herrera. Both Athletic and Real Sociedad have won the Spanish league, including dominating the competition in the early 1980s, with the last title won by a Basque club being Athletic's 1984 title.

At the international level, Basque players were especially prominent in Spanish selections prior to the Civil War, with all of those at the 1928 Olympics, and the majority of the 1920 Olympics and 1934 World Cup squads, born in the region. There is an unofficial 'national' team which plays occasional friendlies, however its squads pick players from the wider territory including Navarre and the French Basque Country.
 
Cycling as a sport is popular in the Basque Country. Abraham Olano has won the Vuelta a España and the World Championship. Marino Lejarreta, nicknamed the "Reed of Berriz" won the Vuelta and many grand tour stages.The UCI World Tour  hails from the Basque Country. Also previously known as Caisse d'Épargne, the Movistar team traces its history back to the Banesto team that included Miguel Induráin. The region is home to the Tour of the Basque Country stage race and the Clásica de San Sebastián one day race. The  team was also part of the World Tour until its disbandment in 2014. It was an unofficial Basque national team and was partly funded by the Basque Government. Its riders were either Basque, or at least grown up in the Basque cycling culture, and former members of the team have been strong contenders in the Tour de France held annually in July and Vuelta a España held in September. Team leaders have included riders such as Iban Mayo, Haimar Zubeldia, Samuel Sánchez, David Etxebarria, Igor Antón, Mikel Landa and Mikel Nieve. The team was revived in 2020 at UCI ProTeam level when Euskaltel reinstated its sponsorship.

Notable people

Some notable Basque people from this administrative jurisdiction include Francisco de Vitoria, philosopher who set the theories of just war, international law and freedom of commerce; Juan Sebastián Elcano, completed first circumnavigation of the Earth; Ignatius of Loyola, founder of the Jesuits; Don Juan de Oñate, explorer of the great plains and Colorado river; Blas de Lezo, naval strategist, best remembered for his defensive tactics at the Battle of Cartagena de Indias; Jorge Oteiza, Eduardo Chillida, sculptors; Paco Rabanne, fashion designer; Cristóbal Balenciaga, fashion designer; Xabi Alonso, Mikel Arteta and Unai Emery, footballers; Edurne Pasaban, first woman to climb all of the fourteen eight-thousander peaks in the World; Elena Arzak, best female chef in the world (2012); Jon Kortajarena male model; Jose-Maria Cundin, artist; Fernando Savater philosopher; Miguel de Unamuno, essayist, novelist, poet, playwright, philosopher.

See also

 Basque Country (greater region)
 Basque mythology
 Basque breeds and cultivars
 Haizea, given name (2012) among 10 most popular names given to newborn girls in Basque Country
 Livestock in the Basque Country

References

 Pierson, Peter (1999). The History of Spain. Westport, Connecticut: Greenwood Publishing Group. .
 Trask, Robert Lawrence (1997). The History of Basque. London: Routledge.

External links

Basque Government
 José Aranda Aznar, “La mezcla del pueblo vasco”, en Empiria: Revista de metodología de ciencias sociales, ISSN 1139-5737, Nº 1, 1998, págs. 121–180.

 
Basque
Green Spain
NUTS 2 statistical regions of the European Union
Regions of Europe with multiple official languages
States and territories established in 1979
Autonomous communities of Spain